Aleksandr Viktorovich Dedyushko (May 20, 1962 – November 3, 2007) was a Russian television actor, best known for war dramas and the Russian version of Dancing with the Stars.

Life
Born as Aliaksandr Dziadziushka (Dziadziushka) in Vawkavysk, Hrodna Voblast, Belarus, he worked with the Vladimir City Theatre from 1989 until 1995. Starting in the early 2000s, Dedyushko became a popular Russian television presenter, actor and singer.

Dedyushko was killed along with his wife and son in a car accident on November 3, 2007, in Petushki, Vladimir Oblast, Russia. Their car apparently skidded on an ice-covered road.

Selected filmography
Taras Bulba (2009) 
Vechernyaya skazka (2007) 
A Driver for Vera (2004) 
Demobbed (2000) 
The Barber of Siberia (1998)
Mother (1989)

References

External links and references

 Official website of the memory actor 

1962 births
2007 deaths
People from Vawkavysk
Russian people of Belarusian descent
Russian male television actors
Russian male stage actors
Russian ballroom dancers
Road incident deaths in Russia
Russian male dancers
Burials in Troyekurovskoye Cemetery
21st-century Russian dancers
20th-century Russian dancers